CFK may refer to:

Carolina for Kibera
Chefornak Airport, Alaska, US, FAA LID code
Compagnie de Chemin de fer du Katanga, a former Belgian Congo railway company
Chemische Fabrik Kalk, a former German chemical company
Cristina Fernández de Kirchner, President of Argentina from 2007 to 2015 and current Vice President of Argentina
Carbonfaserverstärkte Kunststoffe (CFK or CFvK), which translates to carbon fiber reinforced polymer (CFRP)